Maria Margaretha Antje "Marja" Vis (born 15 January 1977) is a retired speed skater from the Netherlands who was active between 1996 and 2010. She competed at the 2002 Winter Olympics in the 5000 metres competition and finished in 13th place.

Results

Personal bests: 
500 m – 39.86 (2002)
 1000 m –  1:17.54 (2007)
 1500 m –  1:55.99 (2007)
 3000 m –  4:04.49 (2007)
 5000 m –  7:02.51 (2007)

References

1977 births
Living people
Dutch female speed skaters
Olympic speed skaters of the Netherlands
Speed skaters at the 2002 Winter Olympics
People from Hoorn
Sportspeople from North Holland
20th-century Dutch women
21st-century Dutch women